Year 1379 (MCCCLXXIX) was a common year starting on Saturday (link will display the full calendar) of the Julian calendar.

Events

January–December 
 May 29 – John I succeeds his father, Henry II, as King of Castile and King of León.
 June 30 – New College, Oxford, is founded in England by William of Wykeham, Bishop of Winchester.
 July 1 – Forces of the Republic of Venice and Ottoman Turks, having invaded Constantinople, restore John V Palaiologos as Byzantine co-emperor. Andronikos IV Palaiologos is allowed to remain as co-emperor, but is confined to the city of Silivri for the remainder of his life.
 September 9 – The Treaty of Neuberg is signed, splitting the Austrian Habsburg lands between brothers Albert III and Leopold III. Albert III retains the title of Duke of Austria.

Date unknown 
 Bairam Khawaja establishes the independent principality of the Kara Koyunlu (Turkomans of the Black Sheep Empire), in modern-day Armenia.
 Dmitry Donskoy of Moscow raids Estonia.
 In the Hundred Years' War, the French lose control of most of Brittany to the English.
 Wisbech Grammar School is founded in England.
 Timur conquers the Sufid Dynasty of Khwarazm

Births 
 October 4 – King Henry III of Castile (d. 1406)
 date unknown
 Jerome of Prague, Hussite (d. 1416)
 Empress Zhang (Hongxi) of China (d. 1442)

Deaths 
 February 18 – Albert II of Mecklenburg (b. c. 1318)
 May 29 – King Henry II of Castile (b. 1333)
 November 15 – Otto V, Duke of Bavaria (b. 1346)
 December 16 – John Fitzalan, Marshal of England (drowned)
 date unknown – Aqsara'i, Persian physician

References